is a Japanese field hockey player. She competed for the Japan women's national field hockey team at the 2016 Summer Olympics.

References

1986 births
Living people
Japanese female field hockey players
Olympic field hockey players of Japan
Field hockey players at the 2016 Summer Olympics
Asian Games bronze medalists for Japan
Asian Games medalists in field hockey
Field hockey players at the 2010 Asian Games
Medalists at the 2010 Asian Games